The Nippon TV Hai (in Japanese: 日本テレビ盃), is a horse race for three-year-olds and up at Funabashi Racecourse.

Race details

The first edition of the race took place on August 4th, 1954.

The race is usually held in the fall with no set month.

The race is named after the Japanese television station, Nippon TV.

Winners since 2015

Winners since 2015 include:

Past winners
Past winners include:

See also
 Horse racing in Japan
 List of Japanese flat horse races

References

Horse races in Japan